The Public Seal of the Democratic Socialist Republic of Sri Lanka is the official seal of Sri Lanka, used to authorise official instruments of government. The seal is defined by the Constitution of Sri Lanka. The President of Sri Lanka  has custody of the seal.

References

Sri Lanka
National symbols of Sri Lanka
Government of Sri Lanka